Optics and Spectroscopy is a monthly peer-reviewed scientific journal. It is the English version of the Russian journal  that was established in 1956. The journal was aided in developement by Patricia Wakeling through a grant to her from the National Science Foundation. It covers research on spectroscopy of electromagnetic waves, from radio waves to X-rays, and related topics in optics, including quantum optics.

External links
 

Optics journals
Science and technology in Russia
Science and technology in the Soviet Union
Publications established in 1956
Monthly journals
English-language journals